Half Moon is a 2006 an internationally co-produced Kurdish comedy-drama film directed by Bahman Ghobadi, who co-wrote the screenplay with Behnam Behzadi, partly inspired by Wolfgang Amadeus Mozart's Requiem. The film stars Ismail Ghaffari as Mamo, an old legendary musician, who sets to trespass the borders of Iranian Kurdistan to give one final concert in Iraqi Kurdistan with his 10 sons.

Half Moon is a part of the New Crowned Hope film series, a celebration of the 250th birthday of Wolfgang Amadeus Mozart.
 The film is an international co-production of Iran, Austria, France and Iraq.

Plot
Mamo, an old Kurdish musician in the twilight of his life, plans to perform one final concert in Iraqi Kurdistan. The village's elderly warn him that as the moon becomes full, something awful would happen to him and urge him not to proceed with his plan. After several months of trying to overcome the red-tape, he begins a long and dangerous journey along with his sons. Along the way, the group picks up female singer Hesho who resides in a village of 1,334 exiled women singers. This adds to the complications of the trip as Hesho did not have authorization to go into Iraq. Despite all these obstacles, Mamo is determined to  continue with his journey across the border.

Critical reception
On review aggregator Rotten Tomatoes, the film holds an approval rating of 100% based on 24 reviews, and an average rating of 7.40/10. The website's critical consensus reads, "Bahman Ghobadi's Half Moon is a beautiful and often humorous look into the lives of Kurdish wanderers." On Metacritic, the film has a weighted average score of 72 out of 100, based on 9 critics, indicating "generally favorable reviews."

Jeannette Catsoulis of The New York Times wrote, "Fateful and funny, haunting and magical, Half Moon balances delicately between the harsh realities of its location and the mystical power of Mamo’s visions.".

Soundtrack
The film's score was composed by Hossein Alizadeh, that contains traditional Kurdish music. The soundtrack was released on CD on January 18, 2008.

Awards
People's choice Award, International Competition, Istanbul International Film Festival, 2007.
Best Cinematography, San Sebastián International Film Festival, 2006.
FIPRESCI Prize, San Sebastián International Film Festival, 2006.
Golden Seashell, San Sebastián International Film Festival, 2006.

References

Further reading

External links

2006 films
2006 drama films
Iranian comedy-drama films
Kurdish films
Kurdish-language films
Films about music and musicians
Films directed by Bahman Ghobadi
Films set in Iran
Films set in Iraq
Films set in Kurdistan
Persian-language films